The 2015 Ivan Hlinka Memorial Tournament was an under-18 international ice hockey tournament held in Břeclav, Czech Republic and Bratislava, Slovakia from 10 to 15 August 2015.

Preliminary round
All times are Central European Summer Time (UTC+2).

Group A

Group B

Final round

Seventh place game

Fifth place game

Semifinals

Bronze medal game

Gold medal game

Final standings

See also
2015 IIHF World U18 Championships
2015 World Junior Championships

External links
 Ivan Hlinka Memorial 2015
 U18 Ivan Hlinka Memorial 2015

Ivan Hlinka Memorial Tournament
2015
International ice hockey competitions hosted by Slovakia
International ice hockey competitions hosted by the Czech Republic
Ivan
Ivan